The surname Alan is a variant spelling of Allan and Allen.  According to one source, Alan is a variant of the English surname Allain.

There is also the given name of Alan.

People with the surname Alan
 A. J. Alan, English magician, intelligence officer, short story writer and radio broadcaster
 Ahmad Alan, Palestinian footballer
 Ali Rıza Alan, Turkish wrestler
 Buddy Alan, American country musician
 Chad Alan, American vocalist and bass guitarist
 Engin Alan, Turkish general
 Hervey Alan, English operatic bass and voice teacher
 John Alan, English-born statesman in Ireland
 Jordan Alan, American film director-producer and television-commercial director
 Joshua Alan, American singer-songwriter and musician
 Lori Alan, American actress and voice actress
 Magic Matt Alan, American radio personality
 Mark Alan, American actor and film producer
 Matthew Alan, American actor
 Michael Alan, artist of drawings, paintings, prints, sculptures, video and performances
 Paul Alan, singer and songwriter
 Ray Alan, English ventriloquist and television entertainer
 Scott Alan, American songwriter
 Steven Alan,  American fashion designer

See also
 Allan (surname), people with surname Allan
 Allen (surname), people with surname Allen
 Alan (given name), people with given name Alan
 FitzAlan, a Breton and then English surname

References 

English-language surnames
Scottish surnames
Lists of people by surname
Surnames from given names